Narayanganj High School & College (formerly known as Narayanganj High School), is one of the oldest educational institutions of Narayanganj. Since its establishment in 1885, Narayanganj High School served the motherland in many ways.

Narayanganj High School & College is a public school located in Kalir Bazar, Narayanganj Sadar Upazila, Bangladesh. The school offers education for students (boys) ranging from first grade to twelfth grade (approximately ages 6 to 18). With over 2,885 students, Narayanganj High School is one of the largest school in the Narayanganj city.

Narayanganj High School & College is noted for its academic performance and extracurricular activities, having produced many notable alumni including leaders in business, the military and state, and national politics as well as senior government officers, scientists, and engineers. The Government of Bangladesh  recognized the school for its strong performance in the Higher Secondary Certificate examination in 2011.

History
At first Narayanganj High School was an Anglo-vernacular school. It became an ME school in 1876 and finally it was promoted to high school in 1885. The school was located on the bank of the river Sitalakhya near Netaiganj from 1885 to 1907. In those days the school used to sit in a fenced house. The name of the first founder of the school is yet to be known.

The school was shifted to its present location from Netaiganj in 1907 with the increase of students. The sub-divisional officer's bungalow was there at that time and the bungalow was also shifted to its present site in the same year. There was a pond behind the school named ‘Ornamental Tank’. The pond is filled up now and some buildings have been constructed.

The name of the first headmaster of the school is yet to be known. Sharat Chandra Basu was the second headmaster (1888-1900). Nagendra Nath Pal took over the charge as headmaster of the school in 1900 while Sharat Babu left the profession. Mr Pal performed his duties competently. Taranath Dey was the most successful headmaster in the history of Narayanganj High School. During his period from 1922 to 1948 the reputation of this institution spread far and wide.

Campus
Narayanganj High School is located on the prime location of Narayanganj District. The campus is in southeast Narayanganj at S. K. Road, just opposite the Narayanganj Rail Junction. The campus consists of dormitories, teachers' quarters, staff quarters, an auditorium, an administrative building, and a full-size football field.

A monument has been built in front of Main Building to commemorate those killed during the Bengali Language Movement demonstrations of 1952. The Language Movement was a political effort in East Pakistan, advocating the recognition of the Bengali language as an official language of Pakistan.

Buildings
With three buildings (including the newly built House), one of which is the Main Building, it is one of the largest school in the Narayanganj Sadar Upazila The school has one field and playgrounds. Two buildings known as Academic Buildings are used for academic purposes. Academic Building 1, is located at the northeast side; and Academic Building 2, is located at southeast corner of the campus.

Academics
The school offers primary education along with secondary education (Secondary School Certificate) for both boys.

Admission
Although Narayanganj High School operates from the 1st through the 10th grade, it only admits students into the 1st, and 6th grades. Consequently, the higher grades have fewer students than the lower grades, as a relatively large number of students transfer out. Admission in the 1st and 6th grades are based on admission tests in written and viva voice. The admission tests for Narayanganj High School are almost competitive.

Curriculum
The curriculum of Narayanganj High School includes traditional primary and secondary level academic subjects from the grade 1st to 5th and 6th to 10th respectively. The curriculum for secondary level academic subjects is introduced by the Board of Intermediate and Secondary Education, Dhaka, Bangladesh.

Students of primary classes take academic core subjects including Bengali, English, mathematics, social science, general science, arts and crafts, religion and physical science. Students have to take agricultural science after completing their primary education. Students of the secondary level have to elect one of the three major programs: Arts and Humanities; Commerce; and Science. Students have some compulsory subjects and some optional subjects in each of the programs.

Academic performance
The Junior School Certificate(J.S.C.)and Secondary School Certificate (S.S.C.) examinations are conducted by the Board of Intermediate and Secondary Education, Dhaka, Bangladesh under the Ministry of Education. S.S.C. is the diploma awarded for the completion of grades one to ten, which is equivalent to the O Levels in the UK. The S.S.C. examination consists of eleven subjects totaling 1,100 marks, with each subject given 100 marks, including practical tests for science subjects. A minimum of 33 marks are required to pass each subject. Subjects will depend on which major program a student has elected to study. These major programs are Sciences; Arts and Humanities; and Commerce. Students have to elect one of these three programs just before enrollment in the 9th grade for SSC, and again in the 11th grade for HSC. Results of both the exams are published in the form of a GPA. The highest score is GPA-5. The Dhaka Education Board annually ranks schools and colleges from across the country in terms of GPA-5 scorers.

The Ministry of Education awarded the institution in 2010 for brilliant performance in the S.S.C. examination.

Uniform
Except in winter, the uniform for students from grades six to tenth consists of a short-sleeved white shirt with navy blue trouser. For students from grades one to fifth, the uniform is a short-sleeved white shirt with navy blue half pants. The uniform differs a bit during the winter season. In winter, students wear a navy blue sweater, in addition to shirt and pants. For footwear, students wear black Oxford shoes with white socks. In addition, college badge are included as part of the uniform.

Administration 
The Chief of The Institue is the "Principal".

Current Principal of the institution is "MD Mahamudul Hasan Bhuiyan".,Assistant Headmaster of the Morning Shift is " Sathi Rani Saha" and Day Shift is "Sree Kamal Kanti".  

The Governing body members are elected for 2 years by vote. The governing body's Chairman " Sree Chandan Seal". Elected body continuing their own decision for their own interest.

Teachers
Primary section: 39 teachers,  Secondary  section: 44 teachers & College Section Teachers:05

Library
There is a massive library situated in the Main Building. The collection of the library includes books, periodicals, newspapers, manuscripts, films, maps, prints, documents, microform, CDs, cassettes, videotapes, DVDs, e-books, audiobooks, databases, and other formats. It provides a huge study space for students on campus; it also provides group study space, such as meeting rooms.

Extracurricular activities
Extracurricular activities are performed by students that fall outside the realm of the normal curriculum of school education.

Alumni Association
Narayanganj High School Alumni

References

External links
 Official website

High schools in Bangladesh
Educational institutions established in 1885
1885 establishments in India
Education in Narayanganj